Yuan Ching may refer to:

Yuan Jing (writer) (1914–1999), Chinese author, also known as Yuan Ching
Yuan Ching Secondary School, a Singaporean secondary school

See also
Yuan Jing (born 1987), Chinese sport shooter